This list is of songs that have been interpolated by other songs; songs that are parodied, a cover version or use a sample of another song are not "interpolations".  It is organized under the name of the artist whose song is interpolated followed by the title of the song, and then the interpolating artist and their song. This list is by no means an exhaustive or complete list. References can also be found in the articles of either the interpolated song or the interpolating song, or both.

Listing

See also 
 Interpolation (popular music)
 List of the most sampled drum breaks

References

 
Interpolated